The Office of Integrative Art is a German group of artists. Based on artistic practices and current discussions of public processes, the office was founded in 2000. Since then Jörg Amonat (born 1960) and Stefan Krüskemper (born 1963) have developed suggestions and realized contributions in changing team constellations. Fields of work are public art, the urban space, and contemporary art strategies.

Solo projects have included:
2007 The Intricate Journey, artist exchange, Neue Gesellschaft für Bildende Kunst, Berlin
2006 Air Borne, public art, Aerodynamic Park, Berlin
1998 Media Installation, art and architecture, Frankenhalle, Nuremberg

Group exhibitions have included:
2007 El Viaje Intricado, Lugar a Dudas, Cali
2004 Permanent produktiv, Kunsthalle Exnergasse, Vienna
2002 life policies Galerie zé dos bois, Lisbon
2001 Utopic Procedures, Westspace Gallery, Melbourne

External links 
 Official website

Bibliography 
 "parkTV", Ed. Verlag für integrative Kunst, Berlin, 2005, 
 "AIR BORNE", Ed. Verlag für integrative Kunst, Berlin, 2006, 

German artist groups and collectives
German contemporary artists